Woman in a Tub (or The Tub) is one of a suite of pastels on paper created by the French painter Edgar Degas in the 1880s and is in the collection of the Hill-Stead Museum in Connecticut. The suite of pastels all featured nude women "bathing, washing, drying, wiping themselves, combing their hair or having it combed" and were created in readiness for the sixth and final Impressionist Exhibition of 1886.

The work demonstrates Degas' mastery of pastel drawing and, like the other works in the suite, portrays a woman engaged in a mundane private activity, in this case spongeing down her bathtub. The same bathtub featured in several of the works in the series and, together with the model's red hair, suggested the women were of the working class, possibly even prostitutes, In their defence Degas retorted  "my women are simple, honest creatures who are concerned with nothing beyond their physical occupations... it is as if you were looking through a keyhole" emphasising the innocence of the models and the voyeurism of the predominantly male viewing public.

Associated works

See also
 100 Great Paintings

References

1886 paintings
Pastel drawings by Edgar Degas
Bathing in art